The Dallas Brass is a brass quintet started by Michael Levine in 1983.  Its repertoire contains patriotic music, classical, and romantic, among others.  
The music ensemble continues to inspire young musicians and motivates its audience through a comedic workshop it provides.

The seven members of the group include Michael A. Levine (director), Buddy Deshler (trumpet), Garrett Klein (trumpet), Juan Berrios (horn), Jim Lutz (trombone), Paul Carlson (tuba), and Craig Hill (percussion).

The Dallas Brass has performed for Presidents Gerald Ford and George H.W. Bush.  The group has also made appearances with Cincinnati Pops, New York Pops, at Carnegie Hall, and around Europe.  The Dallas Brass frequently travels to public schools to present clinics to students as well as work with them on a selection of music.

Six recordings of the Dallas Brass have been released: Debut, Dallas Brass II, A Merry Christmas with Brass, Windborne, Nutcracker, and American Musical Journey.

References

External links
 Official Dallas Brass Website

Brass quintets
American brass bands